For 2006, at least 13 European countries have joined together to create the Silver Series for Europe. The theme for 2006 is distinguished European figures. The following are the countries that issue a Europa Coin in 2006:

See also

References

External links

 The €uro Collection Forum

Coins of the Eurozone